Otto Guelstorff (1878  1959) was a German art director. He worked on around fifty films during his career.

Selected filmography
 Hell of Love (1926)
 Silence in the Forest (1929)
 Rustle of Spring (1929)
 Heilige oder Dirne (1929)
 Love and the First Railway (1934)
 All Because of the Dog (1935)
 Punks Arrives from America (1935)
 Pillars of Society (1935)
 Stronger Than Regulations (1936)
 The Glass Ball (1937)
 Der singende Tor (1939)
The Master of the Estate (1943)
 1-2-3 Corona (1948)

References

Bibliography
 Fox, Jo. Film propaganda in Britain and Nazi Germany: World War II Cinema. Berg, 2007.

External links

1878 births
1959 deaths
German art directors
People from Tilsit